Deported is a 1950 American crime film noir directed by Robert Siodmak and starring Märta Torén and Jeff Chandler.

Plot
An American gangster deported back to his native Italy woos a countess in a plot to bring loot into the country.

Cast
 Märta Torén as the Countess di Lorenzi
 Jeff Chandler as Vittorio Mario Sparducci alias "Vic Smith"
 Claude Dauphin as Bucelli
 Marina Berti as Gina
 Richard Rober as Bemardo Gervaso
 Silvio Mindotti as Armando Sparducci
 Carlo Rizzo as Guido Caruso
 Mimi Aguglia as Teresa Sparducci 
 Adriano Ambrogi as Father Genaro
 Michael Tor as Ernesto Pampilone
 Erminio Spalla as Benjamino Barda 
 Dino Nardi as Donadi
 Guido Celano as Aldo Brescia
 Tito Vuolo as Postal clerk

Production
The film was originally titled Paradise Lost '49 and was to star Dana Andrews, who had appeared in Sword in the Desert, also produced by Robert Buckner, Andrews became unavailable and Victor Mature and John Garfield were discussed as possible alternatives.

Eventually the lead role was assigned to Jeff Chandler after he had impressed Universal Studios with his performance in Sword of the Desert and Broken Arrow. "I don't know why I got it", Chandler said of the role, joking that "maybe it's because I'm saving them money."

Chandler required a three-week leave of absence from the Our Miss Brooks radio program in order to make the film. His second daughter was born during the making of the film.

Much of the film was shot in Italy on location in Naples, Siena and Tuscany over five weeks in late 1949. Of the actors, only Chandler and Märta Torén were brought in from the U.S., with the rest coming from Italy or France. Filming began early in 1950.

Writer-producer Robert Buckner praised filming on location in Italy. He said that Universal had set aside $300,000 in frozen currency to make the film, but he ended up using only $117,000. He also said that if Chandler had not been required to return to the U.S. to fulfil a radio commitment requiring three weeks of filming in a Hollywood studio, another $100,000 could have been saved.

The film is said to be based on the famous Italian gangster Lucky Luciano. However, Chandler denied this, saying that the character that he played was that of a small-time gangster, "and what happens after he lands is quite different from what happened to Luciano. I understand Luciano was really disappointed when our producer, Robert Buckner, mentioned this to him."

See also
 List of American films of 1950

References

External links
 
 
 

1950 films
Film noir
1950 crime drama films
American black-and-white films
American crime drama films
American gangster films
1950s English-language films
Films directed by Robert Siodmak
Films scored by Walter Scharf
Films set in Italy
Universal Pictures films
1950s American films